Samuel Leigh may refer to:

 Samuel Leigh (bookseller), London
Samuel Leigh of the Leigh Baronets
Samuel Leigh (missionary), a Wesleyan missionary active in Australia and New Zealand from 1819 to 1831

See also
Samuel Lee (disambiguation)